Sahid Sudirman Center is a commercial skyscraper at Jalan Jenderal Sudirman in Central Jakarta, Indonesia. The skyscraper is one of the tallest office building in Jakarta, which is 239,8 meters high, has 52 floors above & 4 floors below the ground. The building was funded by a joint venture of Sahid Group, Pikko Group, and Tan Kian Konsorsium which is known as KSO Sahid Megatama Karya Gemilang.

The skyscraper is part of a 5.5 hectares mixed development project of 9 high rise buildings of office, hotel, hospital and apartment towers. Five buildings including this tower have completed. Others are in planning or under construction. A twin towers named Sahid Perdana Tower will be part of the complex. Shahid Sudirman Center has direct basement level connection with already existing Sahid Jaya Hotel & Sahid Sudirman Residences of the complex.

See also

List of tallest buildings in Indonesia
 List of tallest buildings in Jakarta

References

: Height source

Buildings and structures in Jakarta
Skyscrapers in Indonesia
Post-independence architecture of Indonesia
Skyscraper office buildings in Indonesia
Office buildings completed in 2015